Diana Durango Flores (born 2 October 1988) is an Ecuadorian sport shooter. In 2019, she won the silver medal in the women's 25 metres pistol event at the 2019 Pan American Games held in Lima, Peru.

In 2011, she competed in the women's 10 metre air pistol and women's 25 metre pistol event at the 2011 Pan American Games in Guadalajara, Mexico without winning a medal.

She represented Ecuador at the 2020 Summer Olympics in Tokyo, Japan.

References

External links 
 

Living people
1988 births
Ecuadorian female sport shooters
Pan American Games medalists in shooting
Pan American Games silver medalists for Ecuador
Medalists at the 2019 Pan American Games
Shooters at the 2011 Pan American Games
Shooters at the 2019 Pan American Games
South American Games medalists in shooting
South American Games gold medalists for Ecuador
South American Games silver medalists for Ecuador
South American Games bronze medalists for Ecuador
Competitors at the 2018 South American Games
Shooters at the 2020 Summer Olympics
Olympic shooters of Ecuador
Sportspeople from Quito
20th-century Ecuadorian women
21st-century Ecuadorian women